Alexander Derrell Washington Marzette (born March 11, 1993), is an American professional basketball player who last played for EuroNickel 2005 of the Macedonian First League. Marzette played college basketball for the College of Lake County, the Volunteer State, the Southern Indiana Screaming Eagles, the Robert Morris Eagles.

College career 
Marzette received an honorable mention at the end of the 2015 NAIA Division II men's basketball tournament.

Professional career 
In December 2018, Marzette joined FMP of the Basketball League of Serbia. He parted ways with FMP in February 2019 and signed with Novi Pazar for the rest of the 2018–19 season. Novi Pazar parted ways with him in March 2019. On June 27, 2019, he signed with Macedonian basketball club EuroNickel 2005.

References

External links

Player Profile at australiabasket.com
Player Profile at realgm.com
Player Profile at aba-liga.com
Alexander Marzette at fiba.basketball
Player Profile at G League
Player Profile at katajabasket.fi

1993 births
Living people
ABA League players
Basketball League of Serbia players
American expatriate basketball people in Australia
American expatriate basketball people in Finland
American expatriate basketball people in Portugal
American expatriate basketball people in Serbia
American men's basketball players
CAB Madeira players
Junior college men's basketball players in the United States
Kataja BC players
KK FMP players
OKK Novi Pazar players
Robert Morris Eagles men's basketball players
Small forwards
Shooting guards
Southern Indiana Screaming Eagles men's basketball players
Wisconsin Herd players